Vitis labrusca, the fox grape, is a species of grapevines belonging to the Vitis genus in the flowering plant family Vitaceae. The vines are native to eastern North America and are the source of many grape cultivars, including Catawba, Concord, Delaware, Isabella, Niagara, and many hybrid grape varieties such as Agawam, Alexander and Onaka. Among the characteristics of this vine species in contrast to the European wine grape Vitis vinifera are its "slip-skin" that allows the skin of the grape berries to easily slip off when squeezed, instead of crushing the pulp, and the presence of tendrils on every node of the cane. Another contrast with European vinifera is the characteristic "foxy" musk of V. labrusca, best known to most people through the Concord grape. This musk is not related to the mammalian fox, but rather to the strong, earthy aromas characteristic of the grapes that were known by early European-American settlers in the New World. The term "foxy" became a sort of catchall for the wine tasting descriptors used for these American wines that were distinct from the familiar flavors of the European viniferous wines.

History

According to wine historian Edward Hyams and wine expert Jancis Robinson, Vitis labrusca was probably the species seen by Leif Ericsson growing wild along the coast of Vinland in the 11th century. There is ample evidence that the labrusca was growing wild in North America before Europeans arrived. The vine was not officially identified and recorded until Carl Linnaeus and his peers started cataloging American vine species in the mid-18th century. In the 19th century, Vitis labrusca was among the American vines transported to Europe that were carrying the phylloxera louse that caused widespread devastation to the European vineyards planted with Vitis vinifera.

Also in the 19th century, Ephraim Bull of Concord, Massachusetts, cultivated seeds from wild labrusca vines to create the Concord grape which would become an important agricultural crop in the United States.

Vine characteristics
The majority of Vitis labrusca grape varieties are red, although white varieties such as Niagara and "pink-skinned" varieties such as Catawba have dark colored berries high in phenolic compounds that produced strongly flavored wines. As the berries near harvest and become fully ripe, they separate easily from the pedicel (berry stem). If the berry is squeezed gently between two fingers, the thick skin will slip easily off leaving the pulp intact as a ball. This trait gives Vitis labrusca the name of "slip skin" grapes. Another trait of labrusca that aids ampelographers in identification of vines and hybrid varieties descended from the species is the large, thick leaves of the vines that have a hairy underside with dense brown or white hairs.

Like many other American vine species, Vitis labrusca has some natural resistance to many grape diseases, including phylloxera. However, its resistance and grafting compatibility is not as high as that of other species, such as Vitis aestivalis, Vitis rupestris and Vitis berlandieri, and it is not often used for commercial rootstock. It is a robust plant, and in many states can be considered weedy or invasive.

Wine regions

Vitis labrusca can be found along the eastern seaboard of North America from Nova Scotia down to Georgia and westward to the Mississippi river. Among American Viticultural Areas (AVA)s that produce wine from labrusca or hybrids derived from labrusca include Upper Mississippi Valley, Mississippi Delta, Ohio River Valley, Southeastern New England, Lake Erie as well as several AVAs in the states of New York, Virginia, Ohio and Michigan. In the Canadian Province of Ontario, the use of Vitis labrusca varieties is not permitted by the VQA regulatory and appellation system, except for Vidal, a hybrid grape varietal.

Unlike vinifera, hybrids and Vitis labrusca varieties can better withstand the severe continental conditions of eastern North America with severely cold winters and hot, humid summers. (However, labrusca doesn't do quite as well as varieties like Vitis rotundifolia in the humidity of southeastern US). In fact, in areas of the United States where vinifera does flourish in the west, the conditions during the growing season are often too arid for labrusca vines.

"Foxy" musk
According to University of California, Davis viticulture expert A. J. Winkler, outside of the vinifera Muscat family of grapes, Vitis labrusca varieties have the most pronounced aromas among wine grape varieties. The description of "foxy", not derived from the animal, serves as a catch-all term to describe the unique, earthy and sweet muskiness that can be perceived in fresh Concord grapes as well as grape juice made from Concord and other labrusca varieties like Niagara. In the 1920s, scientists were able to isolate the aroma compound responsible for the "foxy" musk as methyl anthranilate.

See also
 List of grape varieties
 Bangalore Blue

References

External links
Plants of the World Online: Vitis labrusca
Flora of North America: Vitis labrusca

labrusca
Flora of the Eastern United States
Flora of Eastern Canada
Crops originating from North America
Plants described in 1753
Taxa named by Carl Linnaeus